Joseph Cheng Tsai-fa (4 July 1932 – 2 September 2022) was a Taiwanese Roman Catholic prelate.

Cheng was born in Xiamen, Fujian, and was ordained to the priesthood in 1957. He served as bishop of the Roman Catholic Diocese of Tainan, Taiwan from 1991 to 2004 and served as archbishop of the Roman Catholic Archdiocese of Taipei, Taiwan, from 2004 until 2007 when he retired.

References

1932 births
2022 deaths
Taiwanese Roman Catholic archbishops
20th-century Roman Catholic bishops in Taiwan
21st-century Roman Catholic bishops in Taiwan
21st-century Roman Catholic archbishops in Taiwan
People from Taipei
People from Xiamen